The Golden Hour is the sixth album by Firewater (their fifth album of original songs), released on May 6, 2008 through Bloodshot Records.

Track listing

Personnel 
Musicians
Sain Muhammad Ali – tumba, additional vocals
Tod Ashley – vocals, Farfisa organ, percussion, loops, photography, design, engineering, mixing
Lal Chand Baral – dhol
Orçun Bastürk – djembe, dumbek, udu
Gulsah Guray – spoken word
Amdad Hussain – dholki
Ijaz Hussain – harmonium
Mangu Khan – dhol, clapping
Tikay Khan – additional vocals
Uri Brauner Kinrot – banjo, electric guitar, acoustic guitar
Avi Lebovich – trombone
Levantine Boys Choir – additional vocals, clapping
Tamir Muskat – drums, percussion, additional vocals, production, mixing
Ozun Usta – djembe, drums, ghatam
Tomer Yosef – banjo, darbouka, djembe, percussion
Itamar Ziegler – acoustic bass, twelve-string guitar, acoustic guitar
Additional musicians and production
Dan Shatsky – engineering
Burok Tamer – engineering
Alan Ward – mastering
Yoni Zigler – photography

References

External links 
 

2008 albums
Bloodshot Records albums
Firewater (band) albums